Barmouth ( (formal); Y Bermo (colloquial)) is a seaside town and community in the county of Gwynedd, northwestern Wales, lying on the estuary of the Afon Mawddach and Cardigan Bay. Located in the historic county of Merionethshire, the Welsh form of the name is derived from aber (estuary) and the river's name, "Mawddach". The English form of the name is a corruption of the earlier Welsh form Abermawdd. The community includes the villages of Llanaber, Cutiau, and Caerdeon.

History 

The town grew around the shipbuilding industry, and more recently as a seaside resort. Notable buildings include the medieval  tower house, the 19th century  roundhouse prison and St John's Church.

 (Citadel of Light), which is located east of the town on the adjoining hillside, was the first tract of land to be donated to the National Trust. Panorama Walk, to the east of the town, was developed as a coastal footpath in the Victorian era to contribute to the town's attractions for visitors. The walk is designated at Grade II on the Cadw/ICOMOS Register of Parks and Gardens of Special Historic Interest in Wales. On the route of the walk stands the Glan-y-Mawddach estate. Originally a Regency villa, the house, which is listed at Grade II, was extended in the late 19th and early 20th centuries and an important garden laid out which is designated at Grade II* on the Cadw/ICOMOS register.

Barmouth features prominently in the novel Austerlitz by Max Sebald. The town is featured in an idyllic light, with the narrator visiting several times during his childhood [see box].

In January 2014, two trains were stranded at Barmouth after severe winter storms destroyed the sea wall at nearby .

Transport
The town is served by Barmouth railway station. Transport for Wales operate northbound services to Pwllheli via Harlech, Porthmadog and Criccieth, and eastbound services to Birmingham International via Tywyn, Machynlleth, Welshpool, Shrewsbury, Telford and Wolverhampton. Connections for southbound services to Borth and Aberystwyth can be made at Dovey Junction or Machynlleth. Barmouth Bridge, which takes the Cambrian Line over the River Mawddach, was also previously at the end of the Ruabon–Barmouth line, which passed through Bala and Dolgellau. The southern end of the bridge is now the start of the Mawddach Trail, a cycle path and walkway that uses the old trackbed.

Local bus services are provided by Lloyds Coaches, and link the town with nearby destinations such as Harlech, Tan-y-Bwlch, Porthmadog and Dolgellau. Cross country bus services are available to Wrexham via Bala, Corwen and Llangollen, as part of the Welsh Government funded TrawsCymru network. The Barmouth Ferry sails from Barmouth to Penrhyn Point, where it connects with the narrow-gauge Fairbourne Railway for the village of Fairbourne. The town has a RNLI lifeboat station with a visitors' centre with shop and viewing gallery.

Sport
Barmouth has one major football team: Barmouth & Dyffryn United, which competes in the Welsh Alliance League. Barmouth is the venue for the annual Barmouth Beach Race, a motocross event. Usually taking place on the last weekend in October, the event sees riders take part in beach racing, using a temporary motocross course constructed on the beach. Over 200 riders typically take part in this event, with spectators attending free of charge. The event attracts champion riders from England and Wales. The harbour hosts the annual Three Peaks yacht race.

Notable people
 John Griffith (1821-1877), a journalist, brought up in Barmouth
 Fanny Talbot (1824–1917), landowner and philanthropist, donated Cliff of Light (Dinas Olau in Welsh), to the National Trust.
 Jim Valentine (1866–1904), rugby union and Northern Union player for Swinton Lions.
 Herbert Tudor Buckland (1869–1951), architect, known for his seminal Arts and Crafts movement houses.
 Commander Harold Lowe (1882–1944), fifth officer of the RMS Titanic.
 John Rippiner Heath (1887–1950), physician and composer.
 Major Bill Tilman, (1898–1977), English mountaineer and explorer, known for his Himalayan climbs and sailing voyages, lived in Barmouth for many years.
 Adrian Dingle (1911–1974), Cornish-Canadian artist.
 Johnny Williams (1926–2007), boxer, once both the British and Empire heavyweight champion.
Tommy Nutter (1943–1992), British tailor, reinvented the Savile Row suit in the 1960s.
 Russell Davies (born 1946), journalist and broadcaster, presents Brain of Britain on BBC Radio 4.
 Charlie Brooks (born 1981), actress, known for EastEnders.

Gallery

See also
 St David's Church, Barmouth
 St John's Church, Barmouth
 St Tudwal's Church, Barmouth
 St Mary and St Bodfan Church, Llanaber

References

External links

 Barmouth community website latest news from Barmouth and historical photo gallery and much more.
 www.geograph.co.uk : photos of Barmouth and surrounding area
 1935 historic film of Barmouth holidaying, carnival and sport

 
Towns in Gwynedd
Registered historic parks and gardens in Gwynedd
Listed buildings in Gwynedd